Walter Graf may refer to:

Walter Graf (bobsledder) (1937–2021), Swiss bobsledder
Walter Graf (musicologist) (1903–1982), Austrian musicologist
Walter S. Graf (1917– 2015), American cardiologist